The Original Disco Duck is the debut album by American DJ Rick Dees, released in 1977, and includes the hit single "Disco Duck".

Critical reception
The editorial board of AllMusic Guide gave this album four out of five stars, with reviewer JT Griffith calling it "a fun novelty record, but not a classic comedy album". Rolling Stone gave the release one star out of five. Billboard declared the album an "utterly inane disk that does not lack charm and merit".

Record World said that the second single "Dis-Gorilla" was "every bit as outrageous [as 'Disco Duck'] and could be every bit the hit."  "Dis-Gorilla" did not repeat the success of "Disco Duck", only reaching #56 on the Billboard Hot 100.

Track listing
"Disco Duck (Part I Vocal)" (Rick Dees) – 3:10
"Barely White (That'll Get It Baby)" (Dees and Bobby Manuel) – 3:45
"Bionic Feet" (Dees and Manuel) – 3:12
"Flick the Bick" (Dees and Manuel) – 4:54
"Disco Duck (Part II Instrumental)" (Mark Blumberg, Manuel, and Lester Snell) – 3:03
"Dis-Gorilla" (Shelly N. Fisher, Willie Hall, and Manuel) – 3:05
"Doctor Disco" (Dees and Manuel) – 4:50
"Bad Shark" (Earl Donelson, Filson Bryant Hawkes, Manuel, James McGehee, Snell, and Peter Vescovo) – 4:17
"He Ate Too Many Jelly Donuts" (Dees) – 3:02
"The Peanut Prance" (Dees, Margaret Kerr, and Manuel) – 2:47

Personnel
Rick Dees – vocals
Andy Black – recording
Scott Blake – backing vocals
Mark Blumberg – horn and string arrangements
William Brown – backing vocals
Diane Davis – backing vocals
Helen Duncan – backing vocals and percussion
Phyliss Duncan – backing vocals and percussion
David Foster – ARP synthesizer
Jay Grayden – ARP programming
Ray Griffin – bass guitar
Willie Hall – drums and percussion
Susan Herr – art direction
Jim Kirk – photography
Johnny Lee – illustration
Pat Lewis – backing vocals
Bobby Manuel – lead and rhythm guitar, percussion, production
Carl Marsh – backing vocals
The Memphis Horns – horns
Ben Cauley
Lewis Collins, Jr.
Charles Findley
Jack Hale
Dick Hyde
J. J. Kelson, Jr.
Andrew Love
Don Menza
James Mitchell
The Memphis Symphony – strings
Gimmer Nicholson – rhythm guitar and slide guitar
Tom Nikosey – design and typography
Larry Nix – mastering at Ardent Mastering, Memphis, Tennessee, United States
Ken Pruitt – backing vocals
Swain Schaeffer – piano
Lester Snell – clavinet, electric piano, horn and string arrangements
Moog-Winston Stewart – ARP programming
Jerry "Joker" Thompson – assistant engineering
Warren Wagner – recording and remixing at Hollywood Sound Recorders, Hollywood, California, United States
Rose Williams – backing vocals

See also
List of 1977 albums

References

External links

1977 debut albums
Albums produced by Bobby Manuel
RSO Records albums
Rick Dees albums